Pterostylis jacksonii, commonly known as the southwest granite snail orchid, is a species of orchid endemic to the south-west of Western Australia. Both flowering and non-flowering plants have a rosette of leaves flat on the ground and flowering plants have a single green and white flower. It is only known from between Walpole and Albany.

Description
Pterostylis jacksonii is a terrestrial, perennial, deciduous, herb with an underground tuber and a compact rosette of leaves  in diameter. The dorsal sepal and petals are fused, forming a slightly inflated hood or "galea" over the column. The labellum is broad but not visible from outside the flower. Flowering occurs in June and July.

Taxonomy and naming
Pterostylis jacksonii was first formally described in 2014 by David Jones and Christopher French from a specimen collected in the Mount Frankland National Park and the description was published in Australian Orchid Review. The species had previously been known as Pterostylis sp. 'granite'. The specific epithet (jacksonii) honours William Pownall Jackson, who discovered this species.

Distribution and habitat
The southwest granite snail orchid grows with moss on granite outcrops between Walpole and Albany in the Warren biogeographic region.

Conservation
Pterostylis echinulata is classified as "not threatened" by the Western Australian Government Department of Parks and Wildlife.

References

jacksonii
Endemic orchids of Australia
Orchids of Western Australia
Plants described in 2014